The Brass City is an album by multi-instrumentalist and composer Joe McPhee with trombonist Jeb Bishop recorded in 1997 and first released on the Okka Disk label.

Reception

Allmusic reviewer Joslyn Layne states "The Brass City finds jazz original Joe McPhee and trombonist Jeb Bishop engaging in an interplay of extended techniques and freed-up structures."

Track listing 
All compositions by Joe McPhee and Jeb Bishop
 "The Brass City I" - 12:17
 "The Brass City II" - 3:44
 "The Brass City III" - 2:16
 "The Brass City IV" - 7:16
 "The Brass City V" - 4:44
 "The Brass City VI" - 5:47
 "The Brass City VII" - 3:47
 "Outpost" - 4:26
 "Transmute" - 6:25
 "The Rozwell Incident" - 8:02

Personnel 
Joe McPhee - pocket cornet, valve trombone, soprano saxophone
Jeb Bishop - trombone

References 

Joe McPhee albums
Jeb Bishop albums
1999 albums
Okka Disk albums